Holumnica (German: Hollomnitz) is a village and municipality in Kežmarok District in the Prešov Region of north Slovakia.

History
In historical records the village was first mentioned in 1293.

Geography
The municipality lies at an altitude of 593 metres and covers an area of 8.944 km².
It has a population of about 870 people.

Economy and infrastructure
In Holumnica is elementary school, kindergarten, public library, football pitch, post, medical service, foodstuff store and cable TV network. Cultural sightseeings are remnants of the castle, manor house, classical evangelical and gothic Roman Catholic churches.

See also
 List of municipalities and towns in Slovakia

References

Genealogical resources
The records for genealogical research are available at the state archive "Statny Archiv in Levoca, Slovakia"
 Roman Catholic church records (births/marriages/deaths): 1768-1896 (parish A)
 Greek Catholic church records (births/marriages/deaths): 1877-1925 (parish B)
 Lutheran church records (births/marriages/deaths): 1785-1906 (parish A)

External links
 
 
 https://web.archive.org/web/20160731061617/http://holumnica.e-obce.sk/
Surnames of living people in Holumnica

Villages and municipalities in Kežmarok District